The 1989 Virginia Slims of New England was a women's tennis tournament played on indoor carpet courts at the Centrum in Worcester in Worcester, Massachusetts in the United States and was part of the Category 5 tier of events of the 1989 WTA Tour. It was the fifth edition of the tournament and was held from October 30 through November 5, 1989. First-seeded Martina Navratilova won the singles title and earned $60,000.

Finals

Singles
 Martina Navratilova defeated  Zina Garrison 6–2, 6–3
 It was Navratilova's 8th singles title of the year and the 146th of her career.

Doubles
 Martina Navratilova /  Pam Shriver defeated  Elise Burgin /  Rosalyn Fairbank 6–4, 4–6, 6–4
 It was Navratilova's 6th doubles title of the year and the 149th of her career. It was Shriver's 7th doubles title of the year and the 101st of her career.

External links
 ITF tournament edition details
 Tournament draws

Virginia Slims of New England
Virginia Slims of New England
Virginia
Virginia